The Gambinos is a 2019 Indian Malayalam-language film directed by Girish Panicker Mattada. The film stars Vishnu Vijay, Radhika Sarathkumar, Sampath Raj and Sijoy Varghese. The film revolves around a mother and her four sons, leading their criminal lives, until the arrival of a young man called Mustafa, who brings unexpected twists and turns to the tale.

Cast 
Vishnu Vinay as Mustafa
Radhika Sarathkumar as Mariamma a.k.a. Mamma
Sampath Raj as Jose
Sijoy Varghese as Crime Branch Officer
Biju Nandakumar as producer.

Production 
Radhika Sarathkumar plays a don in the film.

Reception 
A critic from The Times of India wrote that "The uncertainty in the mind of the filmmaker shows in the film as well in terms of how certain characters and scenes are crafted". A critic from The New Indian Express wrote that "Radhika and Sampath are talented actors no doubt, but except for a few moments which convey their characters’ true colours, they’re terribly miscast here".

References

External links 
 The Gambinos on IMDb